Bortreist på ubestemt tid is a 1974 Norwegian crime film directed by Pål Bang-Hansen, starring Svein Scharffenberg, Ingerid Vardund, Julie Ege and Lasse Kolstad. It is based on the novel by Sigrun Krokvik. The painter Alex (Scharffenberg) has just murdered his wife Christina (Ege), when Helen (Vardund) arrives at his house.

External links
 
 Bortreist på ubestemt tid at Filmweb.no (Norwegian)
 Bortreist på ubestemt tid at the Norwegian Film Institute

1974 films
1974 crime films
1970s Norwegian-language films
Norwegian crime films